Joshiko Saibou (born 7 March 1990) is a German professional basketball player who last played for JDA Dijon of the LNB Pro A. Saibou usually plays as point guard. He is of Togolese descent.

Early career
Saibou started in 2007 with the youth team of Alba Berlin in the NBBL under head coach Henrik Rödl, along with other players including Niels Giffey, Andreas Seiferth and Konstantin Klein.

Professional career
Saibou started his career in 2009 with the professional team of Alba Berlin. In 2011, Saibou signed a two-year contract with Henrik Rödl's TBB Trier. 

In 2016, Saibou signed with the Gießen 46ers. On 2 June 2017, he left Gießen to play for his former club Alba Berlin.

On 10 July 2019, he has signed with Telekom Baskets Bonn of the Basketball Bundesliga (BBL).

On 4 August 2020, he was fired by the Bonn team, due to misconduct in the Corona crisis. In February 2021, he signed with French club Champagne Châlons-Reims Basket. 

On 17 July 2021, he has signed a two-year deal with JDA Dijon of the French LNB Pro A. JDA Dijon also plays in the Basketball Champions League

International career
In November 2017, Saibou was selected for the German national basketball team for the first time. He played with Germany at the 2020 Summer Olympics in Tokyo.

References

1990 births
Living people
Alba Berlin players
Basketball players at the 2020 Summer Olympics
Champagne Châlons-Reims Basket players
Crailsheim Merlins players
German expatriate basketball people in France
German expatriate basketball people in the United States
German men's basketball players
German people of Togolese descent
Giessen 46ers players
JDA Dijon Basket players
Olympic basketball players of Germany
Point guards
s.Oliver Würzburg players
Sportspeople from Cologne